Gadivemula is a village and a Mandal in Nandyal district in the state of Andhra Pradesh in India.

Geography
Gadivemula is situated 27 km from district headquarter Nandyal. It has good transportation from all over the towns surrounded like Nandyal, Nandikotkur, Atmakur and Kurnool.

References

Villages in Nandyal district
Mandals in Nandyal district